The Nicaragua Crisis of 1894-1895 was triggered by the Nicaraguan annexation of the Mosquito Coast, leading to the temporary British occupation of Corinto.

Treaty of Managua
On 28 January 1860, Britain and Nicaragua concluded the treaty of Managua, which transferred to Nicaragua the suzerainty over the entire Caribbean coast from Cabo Gracias a Dios to Greytown but granted autonomy to the Miskito in the more limited Mosquito Reserve (the area described above). King George Augustus Fredric II accepted this change on condition that he should retain his local authority, and receive a yearly subvention of £1000 until 1870. On his death in 1865, Nicaragua refused to recognize his successor, William Henry Clarence.

The reserve nevertheless continued to be governed by an elected chief, aided by an administrative council, which met in Bluefields; and the Miskito denied that the suzerainty of Nicaragua connoted any right of interference with their internal affairs. The question was referred for arbitration to the Habsburg emperor of Austria, whose award (published in 1880) upheld the contention of the Indians, and affirmed that the suzerainty of Nicaragua was limited by the Miskitos' right of self-government.

Annexation of the Mosquito Reserve
In early 1894, Nicaragua invaded the Mosquito Reserve, occupying Bluefields and deposing Prince Robert Henry Clarence, its Hereditary Chief, on 12 February 1894, only to be forced out in July by British and American intervention. When foreign forces withdrew a month later, Nicaragua launched a second invasion, forcibly removing all American and British residents to Managua.

After enjoying almost complete autonomy for fourteen years, on 20 November 1894 the Mosquito Reserve formally became incorporated into that of the republic of Nicaragua by Nicaraguan president José Santos Zelaya. The former Mosquito Coast was established as the Nicaraguan department of Zelaya.

British occupation of Corinto
When Nicaragua refused to pay Britain an indemnity for the annexation of the Mosquito Reserve, the British responded by occupying the Nicaraguan Pacific port of Corinto on 27 April 1895. Eventually the British left after being paid indemnities by the Nicaraguan government.

References

Miskito
History of Nicaragua
1895 in the United Kingdom
Nicaragua–United Kingdom relations